David Stiff (born 8 February 1972) is an Australian former professional basketball player who played 15 seasons in the National Basketball League (NBL). He won six championships with three teams to sit equal first for most individual championships in league history.

Stiff debuted in the NBL in 1992 with the Hobart Devils. He then had a three-year college basketball stint in the United States with the Boston Terriers. Upon returning to Australia, he re-joined the Devils and played a further two seasons. After playing for the North Melbourne Giants in 1997 and 1998, he joined the Adelaide 36ers for the 1998–99 season and won his first championship. He continued on with Adelaide for another three seasons, where in 2002 he won his second championship. Over the next two seasons, Stiff earned a personal three-peat as a member of the Sydney Kings' back-to-back championship teams. In 2004, he joined the Melbourne Tigers and won his fifth championship in his second season. In 2007–08, in what was his 15th and final season, Stiff won his sixth championship as a member of the Tigers. His six NBL championships are equal first for most individual championships in league history alongside C. J. Bruton, Damian Martin and Jesse Wagstaff. In 453 career games, he averaged 9.6 points and 6.1 rebounds per game.

References

External links
NBL stats

1972 births
Living people
Adelaide 36ers players
Australian men's basketball players
Boston University Terriers men's basketball players
Hobart Devils players
Melbourne Tigers players
North Melbourne Giants players
Power forwards (basketball)
Sydney Kings players
Basketball players from Melbourne
Australian expatriate basketball people in the United States
Australian expatriate basketball people in Malaysia